Elton John is a British singer, pianist and composer. He has collaborated with lyricist Bernie Taupin since 1967 and is one of the most successful artists of all time, having sold over 300 million records worldwide in a six-decade career in music. Since starting his music career in 1969, John has done over 4,000 concert performances in more than 80 countries.

John's first tour was the 1970 World Tour, which began in support of his second album Elton John. Between 1979 to 2014, John toured Israel and the USSR with Ray Cooper in a total 234 concerts. Between 1994 to 2010, John toured extensively with fellow pianist and musician Billy Joel in the "Face to Face" tours, which became the longest running and most successful concert tandem in pop music history. John's most recent tour is the ongoing Farewell Yellow Brick Road concert tour, intended as John's final tour which will conclude in 2023.

Tours 

 Elton John 1970 World Tour (1970)
 Goodbye Yellow Brick Road Tour (1973-1974)
 Caribou Tour (1974)
 Rock of the Westies Tour (1975)
 Louder Than Concorde Tour (1976)
 A Single Man Tour (1979)
 Elton John's 1979 tour of the Soviet Union (1979)
 1980 World Tour (1980)
 Jump Up Tour (1982-1983)
 Too Low for Zero Tour (1984)
 European Express Tour (1984)
 Breaking Hearts Tour (1984)
 Ice on Fire Tour (1985-1986)
 Tour De Force (1986)
 Reg Strikes Back Tour (1988-1989)
 Sleeping with the Past Tour (1989-1990)
 The One Tour (1992-1993)
 Face to Face 1994; with Billy Joel (1994)
 Face to Face 1995; with Billy Joel (1995)
 Made in England Tour (1995)
 Big Picture Tour (1997-1998)
 Face to Face 1998; with Billy Joel (1998)
 An Evening with Elton John (1999)
 Medusa Tour (1999-2000)
 Stately Home Tour (2000)
 Face to Face 2001; with Billy Joel (2001)
 2001 Solo Tour (2001)
 Songs from the West Coast Tour (2001-2002)
 Face to Face 2002; with Billy Joel (2002)
 A Journey Through Time (2002)
 Elton John 2003 Tour (2003)
 Face to Face 2003; with Billy Joel (2003)
 Elton John 2004 Tour (2004)
 Peachtree Road Tour (2004-2005)
 Elton John 2006 European Tour (2006)
 The Captain and the Kid Tour (2006-2008)
 Rocket Man: Greatest Hits Live (2007-2010)
 Face to Face 2009; with Billy Joel (2009)
 Face to Face 2010; with Billy Joel (2010)
 Elton John 2010 European Tour (2010)
 The Union Tour; with Leon Russell (2010)
 Greatest Hits Tour (2011-2012)
 40th Anniversary of the Rocket Man (2012-2013)
 The Diving Board Tour (2013-2014)
 Follow the Yellow Brick Road Tour (2014)
 All the Hits Tour (2015)
 The Final Curtain Tour (2015)
 Wonderful Crazy Night Tour (2016-2018)
 Farewell Yellow Brick Road (2018–2023)

See also 
 List of highest-grossing live music artists

References 

 
John, Elton